Parchim is a former Kreis (district) in the southwestern part of Mecklenburg-Western Pomerania, Germany. Neighboring districts were (from the north clockwise) Nordwestmecklenburg, Güstrow, Müritz, the district Prignitz in Brandenburg, the district Ludwigslust and the district-free city Schwerin. The district was disbanded at the district reform of September 2011. Its territory has been part of the Ludwigslust-Parchim district since.

Geography
Most of the district is now agriculturally used, but in the easternmost part there are several lakes, the largest of them being the Plauer See (39 km²). The Plauer See marks the western end of the Müritz lakeland.

History
In 1994 the three districts of Parchim, Sternberg and Lübz were merged into the enlarged district of Parchim. The borders of this new district were roughly identical with the medieval principality of Parchim-Riechenberg, which existed between 1238 and 1316. This district was merged with the district of Ludwigslust at the district reform of September 2011, forming the new Ludwigslust-Parchim district.

Coat of arms

Towns and municipalities
The subdivisions of the district were (situation August 2011):

References

External links

  (German)

Former districts of Mecklenburg-Western Pomerania